Hunter College Elementary School is a New York City elementary school for select students who reside in New York City, located on Manhattan's Upper East Side. Administered by Hunter College, a senior college of the City University of New York or CUNY. Admission is extraordinarily selective with 2% admission rate after a lengthy admission process.

History
Hunter College Elementary School was created in 1940 as an experimental school for gifted students.  It grew out of the Hunter College Model School and assumed its current name in 1941. From its inception until 1973, Hunter College Elementary School was located at the Hunter College campus at 68th Street and Lexington Avenue. Its current location is the Squadron A Armory at 71 East 94th Street in New York City.

The school has enjoyed tremendous success over the years and in the 1950s and 1960s was recognized worldwide for its groundbreaking approach to the education of gifted students. Independent review sites regularly reference the school's exceptional academic and extracurricular programs, as well as the daunting admissions process.  Students from the elementary school generally continue from Kindergarten to 6th grade, and then (through affiliated Hunter College High School, located in the same building) through 12th grade.  The Wall Street Journal published a study in 2007 that showed Hunter to be among the top 20 feeder schools to top universities in the United States, and the only public school listed in the top 20.

Alumni
Notable alumni include:

Ron Brown, former U.S. Secretary of Commerce
Adam Cohen, scientist and professor at Harvard University
Bran Ferren, inventor
Roy M. Goodman, former New York State Senator
Elena Kagan, U.S. Supreme Court justice
Margaret Lefranc, former painter
Bobby Lopez, songwriter, EGOT winner
Fred Melamed, actor, comedian, and writer
Lin-Manuel Miranda, composer and actor best known for Hamilton
Cynthia Nixon, actress and political activist
Jonathan Tunick, orchestrator and musical director; EGOT winner
Hugh David Politzer, Nobel Prize winner in Physics (2004)

See also
 Hunter College
 Hunter College High School

Further reading
 Subotnik, Rena, et al. (1993) Genius Revisited: High IQ Children Grown Up. Ablex Publishing. .

References

External links 
 Hunter College Elementary School

Magnet schools in New York (state)
Gifted education
Public elementary schools in Manhattan
Hunter College
Educational institutions established in 1940
1940 establishments in New York City